Khan Abdul Bahram Khan was the founder of major political family of Pakistan. Khan Abdul Bahram Khan's sons Khan Abdul Jabbar Khan (usually referred to as "Dr. Khan Sahib") and Abdul Ghaffar Khan (Bacha Khan) were political leaders in Pakistan.
 
Abdul Bahram Khan was a land owner, farmer, and the chief of Pashtun tribe Mohammadzai in Charsadda, North-West Frontier Province, British India.

See also 
 Abdul Ghani Khan
 Abdul Ghaffar Khan
 Abdul Wali Khan
 Family of Bahram Khan

References

Pashtun people
Khan Abdul
Pakistani landowners